Éxitos y Más (Spanish "Hits and More") may refer to:

Albums
Éxitos y Más (Monchy y Alexandra album) 2006
Éxitos y Más, compilation album by Olga Tañón 1995
Exitos y Mas, compilation album by Tito Rojas 2007
Éxitos y Más, compilation album by Milly Quezada 2001
Éxitos y Más, compilation album by Puerto Rican Power Orchestra 2006
Éxitos y Más, compilation album by Los Enanitos Verdes 2005
Éxitos y Más, compilation album by Lisandro Meza 2002
Éxitos y Más, compilation album by El Gringo de la Bachata (Ramón Alberto Castillo Gálvez) 2007
Éxitos y Más Éxitos, compilation album by Vicente Fernández 1990
Éxitos y Más Éxitos, compilation album by 2Mex
Exitos Y Algo Mas, Oscar D'León 1991